Faristenia obliqua is a moth in the family Gelechiidae. It is found in Taiwan.

The wingspan is 15–17 mm. The forewings are orange white to greyish orange with an oblique dark brown fascia from one-sixth of the costa to one-fourth of the dorsum. There is a dark brown, trapezoidal costal patch, with two small patches beyond it. The hindwings are pale grey.

References

Faristenia
Moths described in 2000